Donald Louis Newhauser (born November 7, 1947) is an American former professional baseball pitcher. He played in Major League Baseball (MLB) for the Boston Red Sox from 1972 to 1974.

Biography
Newhauser played high school baseball for Monsignor Edward Pace High School in Miami Gardens, Florida. He then played college baseball at Broward Community College. He was selected by the Boston Red Sox in the second round of the 1967 MLB draft.

Newhauser began his professional baseball career in 1967 with the Greenville Red Sox, a Red Sox farm team in the Western Carolinas League. He reached the Triple-A level in 1971, with the Louisville Colonels.

The following season, Newhauser made his MLB debut in June, and appeared 31 games (all in relief) with the 1972 Red Sox, compiling a 4–2 record with a 2.43 earned run average (ERA) while recording 27 strikeouts in 37 innings pitched. Newhauser only made 11 more major league appearances; nine games in 1973 and two games in 1974. Overall, he made 42 major league appearances, all in relief with the Red Sox, registering a 2.39 ERA and 37 strikeouts in  innings pitched with a 4–3 record.

Newhauser pitched in Minor League Baseball for the Red Sox organization through 1975, then finished his career in 1976 with the Charleston Charlies, a Triple-A affiliate of the Pittsburgh Pirates. He appeared in a total of 321 minor league games in parts of 10 seasons.

References

Further reading

External links

1947 births
Living people
Baseball players from Miami
Major League Baseball pitchers
Boston Red Sox players
Broward Seahawks baseball players
Greenville Red Sox players
Winston-Salem Red Sox players
Louisville Colonels players
Pawtucket Red Sox players
Charleston Charlies players
Broward College alumni
Monsignor Edward Pace High School alumni